The All-Ireland Senior B Hurling Championship 2003 was the 25th staging of Ireland's secondary hurling knock-out competition.  Wicklow won the championship, beating Roscommon 4-16 to 2-13 in the final at Croke Park, Dublin.

Sources

 Donegan, Des, The Complete Handbook of Gaelic Games (DBA Publications Limited, 2005).

2003
B